An intermediate spiral galaxy is a galaxy that is in between the classifications of a barred spiral galaxy and an unbarred spiral galaxy. It is designated as SAB in the galaxy morphological classification system devised by Gerard de Vaucouleurs. Subtypes are labeled as SAB0, SABa, SABb, or SABc, following a sequence analogous to the Hubble sequence for barred and unbarred spirals. The subtype (0, a, b, or c) is based on the relative prominence of the central bulge and how tightly wound the spiral arms are.

Examples

References

 

Galaxy morphological types